Don Brown (born 23 March 1953) is a former Australian rules footballer who played with Footscray in the Victorian Football League (VFL).

Notes

External links 
		

Living people
1953 births
Australian rules footballers from Victoria (Australia)
Western Bulldogs players